Lukas Jäger (born 12 February 1994) is an Austrian professional footballer who plays for Rheindorf Altach.

References

1994 births
Living people
People from Bregenz District
Footballers from Vorarlberg
Austrian footballers
Association football midfielders
Association football defenders
Austria under-21 international footballers
Austria youth international footballers
Austrian Football Bundesliga players
2. Liga (Austria) players
Regionalliga players
Bundesliga players
2. Bundesliga players
SC Rheindorf Altach players
1. FC Nürnberg players
1. FC Nürnberg II players
SK Sturm Graz players
Austrian expatriate footballers
Austrian expatriate sportspeople in Germany
Expatriate footballers in Germany